Nanning–Kunming high-speed railway (formerly known as the Yunnan–Guangxi high-speed railway) is a high-speed railway connecting Nanning and Kunming, respectively the capitals of the Guangxi Zhuang Autonomous Region and Yunnan Province. Positioned as part of China's "long-term railway network plan", to improve the layout and the development of South-Western China with critical infrastructure, it was Yunnan Province's first high-speed transport corridor to the sea. With future Pan-Asian railways to Laos, Thailand and Vietnam planned or under construction, this railway will be seen as a crucial link between the economic powerhouse of the Pearl River Delta Economic Zone and Indochina under the One Belt-One Road initiative.

History
 December 27, 2009 – Construction of the Nanning–Kunming high-speed railway started.
 June 20, 2011 – Xiaotuanshan tunnel breakthrough.
 October 2015 – Phase 1 from Nanning to Baise completed construction and testing began.
 December 11, 2015 – Phase 1 opened and operations from Nanning to Baise section commenced, with CRH2A trains.
 December 28, 2016, Phase 2 opened and operations from Baise to Kunming section commenced.

Route
Construction started on December 27, 2009, with the first phase from Nanning to Baise opening on December 11, 2015. It saw 17 new stations constructed, with three more stations being renovated. Built with a total investment of nearly 90 billion RMB, it was expected that the construction period would have a duration of six years.

Starting at Nanning's Xixiangtang District the railway travels north-west through Long'an County to Baise's Pingguo County, Tiandong County and Tianyang County before reaching Baise urban Youjiang District itself. After this, the second phase of the route goes westward across Youjiang District into Yunnan Province's Funing County, Guangnan County and Qiubei County in Wenshan. Turning north-west again, the line crosses Mile City in Honghe. Now progressing northwards, the line enters Kunming's Shilin Yi Autonomous County before cutting across Yuxi's Chengjiang County before re-entering Kunming through Yiliang County. Chenggong District and terminating in the Guandu District.

Nanning–Baise section
 Railroad Grade: I level
 The number of main lines: Double
 Limiting gradient: 12‰
 Maximum speed: 250 km/h
 Minimum curve radius: Usually 5500 m, 4500 m difficult regions
 Type of traction: Electrical
 Rolling Stock: EMU
 Traction Quality: 4000 t
 Effective platform length: 650 m
 Block Type: Automatic Block

Baise–Kunming section
 Railroad Grade: I level
 The number of main lines: Double
 Limiting gradient: Baise to Kunming 9‰, afterburner slope 18.5‰; Kunming South to Shilin Banqiao partial 23.5‰
 Maximum speed: 200 km/h (reserved 250 km/h)
 Minimum curve radius: Usually 5500 m, 4500 m difficult regions
 Type of traction: Electrical
 Rolling Stock: EMU
 Traction Quality: 4000 t
 Effective platform length: Baise to Shilin Banqiao 880 m, 650 m Shilin Banqiao to Kunming South
 Block Type: Automatic Block

Stations
Kunming South, Jingkai, Yangzong, Shilin West, Mile, Xinshao, Hongshiyan, Puzhehei, Zhulin, Guangnan, Bailazhai, Funing, Bo'ai, Yangwei, Baise, Tianyang, Tiandong North, Pingguo, Long'an East, Nanning West and Nanning

References

High-speed railway lines in China
Rail transport in Guangxi
Rail transport in Yunnan
Standard gauge railways in China
Railway lines opened in 2015